Alexander Ballegaard Ammitzbøll (born 17 February 1999) is a Danish professional footballer who plays for Aalesund as a forward.

Club career

Early career
Ammitzbøll started playing football in a local club called Stilling IF at the age of 6, before him and his family moved to Skanderborg and Ammitzbøll switched to FC Skanderborg as U14 player. In December 2015, at the age of 16, Ammitzbøll was invited to a trial at the Italien club A.C. Milan. He then participated in the talent teams in AGF Club collaboration, since FC Skanderborg and AGF are partner clubs, and in the summer 2016, he then joined the U-19 squad of AGF.

AGF
Ammitzbøll joined the first team in the pre-season 2017/18 and also played friendly games with them. A year after his arrival, on 13 August 2017, Ammitzbøll got his debut for the first team of AGF. It happened against OB in the Danish Superliga where he started on the bench, but replaced Jakob Ankersen in the 76th minute. At the end of the same month, the player extended his contract for two years.

Since his debut, Ammitzbøll didn't play for the first team in one and a half year, and he continued with the U-19 squad. But in 2019, he began to play more with the first team. After participating in two games for AGF in the beginning of 2019, the club offered him a new contract until the end of 2021 on 14 March 2019, which he signed. On 28 April, he scored his first goal in a 3-1 victory against AC Horsens.

On 7 March 2020 the club confirmed, that Ammitzbøll had been loaned out to FK Haugesund until the end of 2020.

Career statistics

References

External links
Alexander Ammitzbøll at AGF's website

Danish men's footballers
Danish expatriate men's footballers
1999 births
Living people
Danish Superliga players
Eliteserien players
Aarhus Gymnastikforening players
FK Haugesund players
Aalesunds FK players
Association football forwards
Denmark youth international footballers
Danish expatriate sportspeople in Norway
Expatriate footballers in Norway